The Salt Range Coal Mine is a coal mine located in Punjab. The mine has coal reserves amounting to 213 million tonnes of coking coal, one of the largest coal reserves in Asia and the world.

See also 
List of mines in Pakistan

References 

Mines in Pakistan
Coal mines in Pakistan
Economy of Punjab, Pakistan